Cavernicola is a genus of assassin bugs in the family Reduviidae. They are endemic to the wild ecotopes of Panama and northern South America. Cavernicola species, as well as many other Reduviidae insects, are considered vectors of Trypanosoma cruzi, a known cause of Chagas disease.

Cavernicola pilosa feeds primarily on bats, but has been reported as biting humans.

Species
 Cavernicola lenti (Barrett & Arias, 1985)
 Cavernicola pilosa (Barber, 1937)

References

Reduviidae
Hemiptera of South America
Hemiptera of Central America
Cimicomorpha genera